Trifurcula aurella is a moth of the family Nepticulidae. It is known from France, Italy, Croatia and Greece.

The wingspan is about 7 mm.

External links
Zwei neue Microlepidopteren aus Dalmatien
Fauna Europaea

Nepticulidae
Moths of Europe
Moths described in 1933